Horsin' Around is the sixth and final studio album by American R&B singer Carrie Lucas, released in 1984 by Constellation Records. Eddie Murphy has a cameo on the title track.

Track listing
Side one
"Summer in the Street" – 6:00
"Charlie" – 5:18
"Goin' in Circles" – 4:30
"Horsin' Around" – 4:30

Side two
"Hello Stranger" – 5:50
"Let's Keep Dancing" – 5:57
"Somebody Said" – 3:24
"Superstar" – 4:40

Charts

Singles

References

External links
 

1984 albums
Carrie Lucas albums